Claudia Durastanti (born 8 June 1984, Brooklyn) is an Italian writer and translator.

She was shortlisted for the 2019 Strega Prize and Viareggio Prize with La Straniera (La nave di Teseo, 2019). The book is translated into twenty-one languages and is being adapted into a TV show.

She graduated in Cultural Anthropology from the Sapienza University of Rome. Her work appeared in Granta, the Los Angeles Review of Books and The Serving Library.

She is a board member of the Turin International Book Fair and co-founded the Italian Festival of Literature in London.

She translated works by Joshua Cohen and Donna Haraway, as well as Ocean Vuong's On Earth We're Briefly Gorgeous and F. Scott Fitzgerald's The Great Gatsby.

She writes a music column for Internazionale and serves as a curator for the feminist imprint La Tartaruga, founded by Laura Lepetit in 1975.

Works

In Italian 

 Un giorno verrò a lanciare sassi alla tua finestra, Venezia, Marsilio, 2010 .
 A Chloe, per le ragioni sbagliate, Venezia, Marsilio, 2013 .
 Cleopatra va in prigione, Roma, minimum fax, 2016 .
 La straniera, Milano, La nave di Teseo, 2019 .

In English 

 Cleopatra Goes To Prison, translator Christine Donougher, Dublin : The Dedalus Press, 2020. 
 Strangers I Know, translator Elizabeth Harris, Fitzcarraldo Editions, January 2022.

References 

1984 births
Italian novelists
Living people